American Hangman is a 2019 Canadian thriller film written and directed by Wilson Coneybeare and starring Donald Sutherland and Vincent Kartheiser. The film premiered on Netflix on January 4, 2019, and showed in theatres in Canada on March 8, 2019.

Cast
 Donald Sutherland as Judge Straight
 Vincent Kartheiser as Henry David Cole
 Oliver Dennis as Lieutenant Roy
 Al Sapienza as Detective Steptoe
 Paul Braunstein as Ron
 Lucia Walters as Harper Grant
 Joanne Boland as Stokely
 Jess Salgueiro as Darnley
 Parveen Kaur as Kaitlyn
 Genelle Williams as Barbara
 Alex Crowther as Josh Harkridge

Reception
Jeffrey M. Anderson of Common Sense Media awarded the film three stars out of five. Bobby LePire of Film Threat awarded the film seven and a half stars out of ten.

References

External links
 
 

2019 films
Canadian thriller films
2019 thriller films
English-language Canadian films
2010s English-language films
2010s Canadian films